Clathrus oahuensis is a species of fungus in the stinkhorn family. Described as new to science in 1971, it is found in Hawaii.

References

External links

Phallales
Fungi of North America
Fungi described in 1971